Brett James is the self-titled debut album of American country music singer-songwriter Brett James. It was released on September 12, 1995 via Arista Nashville's Career Records division. The singles "Female Bonding", "If I Could See Love" and "Worth the Fall" all entered the Hot Country Songs charts.

Critical reception
An uncredited review from Allmusic gave Brett James three stars out of five, calling it "a hard-rocking set of original songs that owe a great debt to honky tonk and traditional country." Richard McVey II of Country Standard Time described the album as "pretty much your standard country record with average material and average vocals that leads to an average review of an average artist."

Track listing
All songs written or co-written by Brett James; co-writers indicated in parentheses.
"Wake Up and Smell the Whiskey" (Dean Miller) – 2:52
"Many Tears Ago" (Hunter Armistead) – 3:53
"Worth the Fall" – 3:00
"She's Killin' Me" (Jennifer Kimball) – 4:04
"If I Could See Love" (Steve Bogard) – 3:02
"Female Bonding" – 3:18
"Dark Side of the Moon" – 4:12
"Just Like We Never Happened" – 3:28
"Thrill of the Chase" – 2:43
"The Way That You Love" – 3:50
"Enjoy the Ride" – 3:37

Singles

Personnel
Musicians
Bruce Bouton – steel guitar
Paul Franklin – steel guitar
Rob Hajacos – fiddle
Dann Huff – electric guitar
Jeff King – electric guitar
Chris Leuzinger – electric guitar
Chris Rodriguez – background vocals
Matt Rollings – piano
John Wesley Ryles – background vocals
Judson Spence – background vocals
Biff Watson – acoustic guitar
Dennis Wilson – background vocals
Lonnie Wilson – drums
Glenn Worf – bass guitar

Technical
Steve Bogard – producer
Mike Clute – producer, recording, mixing
Glenn Meadows – mastering

References

1995 debut albums
Arista Records albums
Brett James albums